Raigad Lok Sabha constituency is one of the 48 Lok Sabha (lower house of Indian parliament) constituencies of Maharashtra state in western India. It is a new constituency, created in 2008 as a part of the implementation of the delimitation of the parliamentary constituencies based on the recommendations of the Delimitation Commission of India constituted on 12 July 2002. The constituency first held elections in 2009 and its first member of parliament was Anant Geete of Shiv Sena who was also re-elected in the 2014 elections. In the 2019 General Elections Sunil Tatkare of NCP won the seat by margin of 31,438 votes defeating the incumbent Geetee who was also a Union Cabinet minister.

History

Raigad was historically called Kolaba, and was the capital of the Maratha king Shivaji.

Assembly segments
At present, Raigad Lok Sabha constituency comprises six Vidhan Sabha (legislative assembly) segments in 2 district's. These segments are:

Pen, Alibag and Shrivardhan Vidhan Sabha segments were earlier part of the former Kolaba Lok Sabha constituency. Mahad was earlier part of the Ratnagiri Lok Sabha Constituency.

Members of Parliament

Election results

General Elections 2019

General election 2014

General election 2009

See also
 Kolaba Lok Sabha constituency
 List of Constituencies of Maharashtra Assembly
 List of Constituencies of the Lok Sabha
 Raigad district
 Ratnagiri district
 Ratnagiri Lok Sabha constituency

References

External links
Raigad lok sabha  constituency election 2019 results details

Lok Sabha constituencies in Maharashtra
Lok Sabha constituencies in Maharashtra created in 2008
Politics of Raigad district
Ratnagiri district